Sinan Hasani (14 May 1922 – 28 August 2010) was a Yugoslav novelist, statesman, diplomat and a former President of Presidency Yugoslavia, a revolving form of executive leadership which rendered him the President of Yugoslavia at the time as well. He was of Albanian ethnicity.

Early life and career
Hasani finished primary school and Gazi Isa-bey madrasah (high school) in Skopje. He became a writer and wrote his first Albanian language novel, The Grape Starts to Ripen, in 1957.

Hasani joined the Yugoslav Partisan resistance movement in 1941, during the war, and the Yugoslav Communist Party in 1942. He found himself in Nazi German captivity in 1944, and spent time in a POW camp near Vienna until the end of World War II. After the war, he attended the Đuro Đaković party school in Belgrade (1950–52). Later, he became leader of the Socialist Union of the Working People mass organization in Kosovo, and was from 1965 to 1967 manager of the Kosovar publishing house Rilindja. From 1971 to 1974, he was the Yugoslav ambassador to Denmark. In 1975 he was elected Deputy Speaker of the Yugoslav Federal Assembly, and remained in that position until he became the leader of the League of Communists of Kosovo in 1982.

Presidency
Hasani was elected as the Kosovan member of the Yugoslavian presidency in 1984 with his term ending in 1989. He also served as head of the rotating presidency. On Hasani's first day as president, he and his presidency unanimously appointed Branko Mikulić as the federal Prime Minister of Yugoslavia. After Mikulić and his cabinet voluntarily resigned in March 1989, as the first federal ministry in the history of Socialist Yugoslavia, Hasani initially supported the unsuccessful bid of the Milošević loyalist and Serb hardliner Borisav Jović, to become the federal PM. It was contrary to the candidacy of the economically liberal reformist Ante Marković, which was proposed by the republics of Slovenia and Croatia, and finally approved by the Federal Assembly of Yugoslavia, and also by the outgoing presidency, including Hasani himself.

Hasani died in Belgrade on 28 August 2010.

Relations with the Albanian community
As an ethnic Albanian, Hasani was perceived by the wider Albanian community of Yugoslavia as highly controversial because of the continued oppressive situation of the ethnic Albanians during his leadership. He used his position to feed the interests of the Slavic majority ; he was thus unsympathetic towards the architects who fought for Albanian non-Yugoslavian interests, mostly in Kosovo, much to the anger of the Albanians in Yugoslavia.

Hasani is also remembered for his undiplomatic deals with the leader of Albania, Enver Hoxha who in turn, through his patriotic speeches, gained a lot of support among the ethnic Albanians in Yugoslavia. Hasani had tagged Enver Hoxha "a scabby goat" (a Serbian idiom), while Hoxha called Hasani "a Serbian dog" in response to this. These events nevertheless, occurred some time before Hasani became head of presidency—Hoxha had died in 1985.

Works
Hasani also wrote a number of novels in Albanian, which were translated into Serbo-Croatian and Macedonian.

Novels
 Një natë e turbullt ("A troubled night", 1966)
 Fëmijëria e Gjon Vatrës ("The childhood of Gjon Vatra", 1975)
 Për bukën e bardhë ("For the white bread", 1977)

Other works
 Kosovo : istine i zablude, ("Kosovo, Truths and Illusions" 1986, in Serbian, concerning Albanian nationalism in Kosovo)
 Në fokus të ngjarjeve : bisedë me Sinan Hasanin / Tahir Z. Berisha ("In the focus of events, a conversation with Sinan Hasani / Tahir Z. Berisha" 2005, Biography)

Notes

References
Raif Dizdarević, Od smrti Tita do smrti Jugoslavije ("From Tito's death to the death of Yugoslavia", Sarajevo: Svjetlost, 2000)

External links

|-

1922 births
People from Viti, Kosovo
Presidents of the Socialist Federal Republic of Yugoslavia
Serbian novelists
Kosovan soldiers
Kosovan writers
Yugoslav Partisans members
Serbian people of World War II
Ambassadors of Yugoslavia to Denmark
Kosovo Albanians
League of Communists of Kosovo politicians
2010 deaths
Central Committee of the League of Communists of Yugoslavia members
20th-century Serbian novelists
Yugoslav Albanians
Yugoslav writers